(English name before 2014: Nippon Meat Packers, Inc.) is a food processing conglomerate headquartered in Umeda, Kita-ku, Osaka, Japan.

History
Founded in 1949, the company is commonly known as Nippon Ham. As a multinational corporation, Nippon Ham operates subsidiaries around the world, including China and the United States. In addition to its main business of meat packing and other food processing, the company owns the Hokkaido Nippon-Ham Fighters, a professional baseball team in Japan's Pacific League, and owns part of the J-League soccer team, Cerezo Osaka.

References

External links
Nippon Ham homepage (English)
Nippon Ham homepage (Japanese)

Companies listed on the Osaka Exchange
Food and drink companies established in 1949
Manufacturing companies based in Osaka
Food and drink companies of Japan
1949 establishments in Japan